The Cardinal Stakes is a Grade III American thoroughbred horse race for fillies and mares three-years-old and older over a distance of one and one eighth miles on the turf held annually in November at Churchill Downs in Louisville, Kentucky. The event offers a purse of $100,000.

History

The event was named after the official state bird of Kentucky, the Northern cardinal. 

The event was inaugurated on 23 November 1974, as the Kentucky Cardinal Stakes as a  miles dirt race for three year olds and was won by veterinarian Albert F. Polk Jr's Cut the Talk, who was trained by Ohio native James E. (Jim) Morgan and ridden by Darrell Brown in a time of 1:45.

The event was run for three year olds only one more time in 1975. In the 1976 the conditions of the event were changed to fillies and mares that were three years old or older at a distance of seven furlongs as the Kentucky Cardinal Handicap. In 1982 the event was increased to 1 mile for one year and in 1983 increased again to back its inaugural running distance of  miles. In 1987 the event was scheduled on the turf over a distance of  miles with the name Cardinal Handicap. The following year the distance of the event increased to  miles but it was moved off the turf and onto the main track due to inclement weather.

The American Graded Stakes Committee classified the event as Grade III in 1995. The 2017 edition of the race, won by Tricky Escape, was run on dirt as the turf course was deemed unfit for racing. The race's Grade III status was kept for 2017.

The event has been run in split divisions nine times, the last of which was in 1990. 

The event was run as a handicap prior to 2019.

The event was not run in 2020 and 2021.

Records
Speed record:
 miles:  1:47.29  – Daisy Devine    (2012)
 miles (dirt): 1:45.20 - Cut the Talk (1974)
7 furlongs (dirt): 1:24.20  - Unreality (1978), Safe Play (1981)

Margins:
5 lengths – Vite View (1980), Lake Champlain (IRE) (1987)

Most wins:
 no horse with more than one win 

Most wins by an owner:
 3 – Helen C. Alexander (1988, 1992, 2009)

Most wins by a jockey:
 5 – Pat Day (1983, 1987, 1990, 1994, 1995)

Most wins by a trainer:
 6 – William I. Mott (1985, 1987, 1995, 1997, 2008, 2011)

Winners

Legend:

 
 

Notes:

† In the 1996, running Bail Out Becky was first past the post by  lengths but was disqualified for interference as the horse turned into the straight bumping the eventual second place finisher Miss Caerleona. Miss Caerleona was declared the winner and Bail Out Becky placed second.

See also
 List of American and Canadian Graded races

External site
 Churchill Downs Media Guide - $175,000 Cardinal (Grade III)

References

Graded stakes races in the United States
Grade 3 stakes races in the United States
Turf races in the United States
Mile category horse races for fillies and mares
Churchill Downs horse races
Recurring sporting events established in 1974
1974 establishments in Kentucky
Horse races in Kentucky